= Xavier Vernetta =

Catalan literary professor and translator

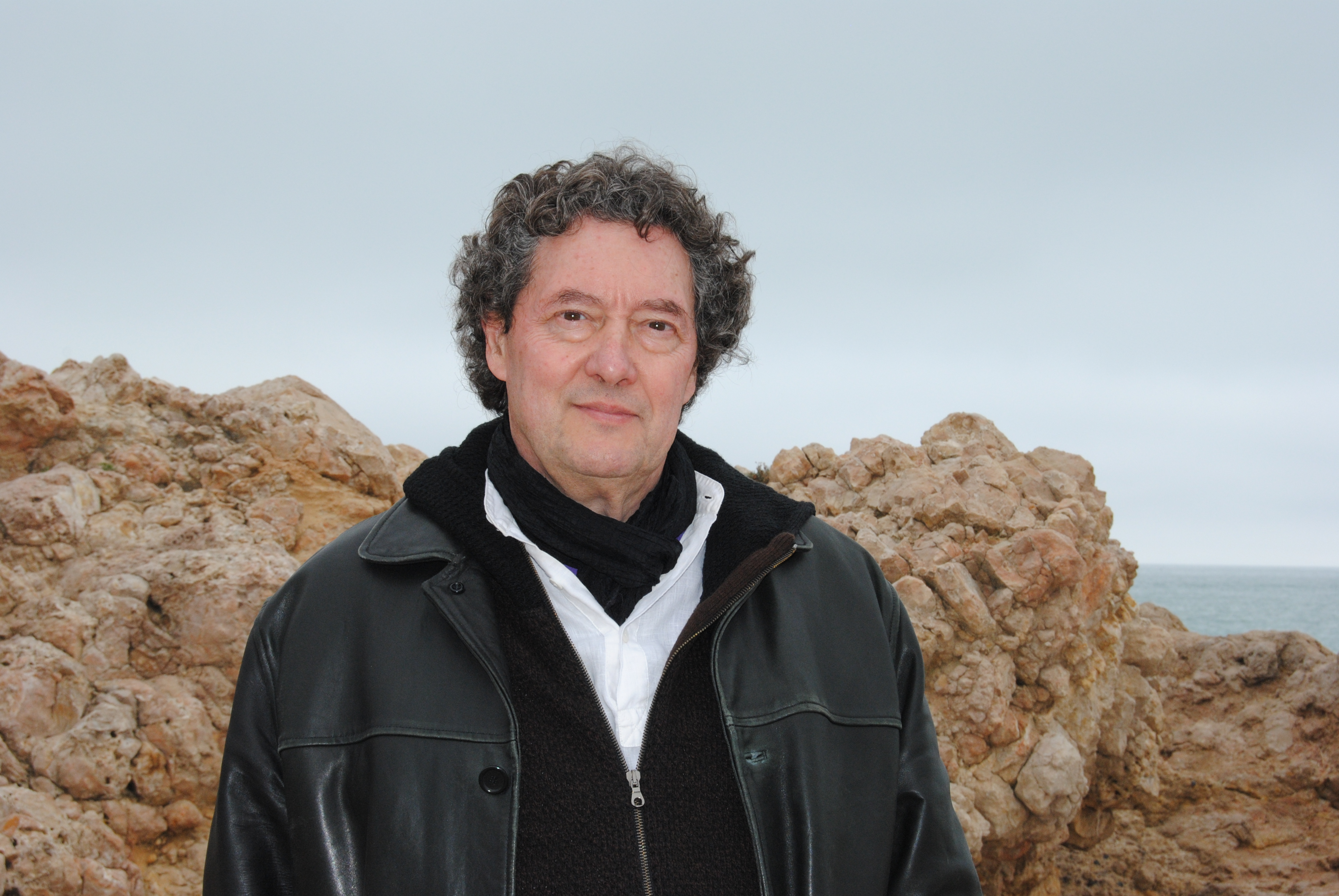
- Xavier Vernetta, beach of the republic. Vilanova i la Geltrú, 2020
- Born: 11 October 1956 (age 69); Barcelona, Spain
- Occupations: Professor, writer
- Writing career
- Pen name: Neva Esbrí (in the articles of literary criticism)
- Language: Catalan
- Notable awards: Fundació Enciclopèdia Catalana de narrativa, 2004; Lleida per a Projecte de novel·la, 2007

Xavier Vernetta i Gallart (born 11 October 1956 in Barcelona) is a Spanish professor of literature, literary critic, translator and writer.

He has a degree in Contemporary History and Catalan Philology from the University of Barcelona. He has published about a dozen narrative works in Catalan, covering genres such as short stories, novel for adults, the young adult novel or fairytale. In 2003 he received ex aequo the Premi de Narrativa de la Fundació Enciclopèdia Catalana Prize for his work Parlem d'amor, and in 2007, the Lleida Prize for País de llops. He has been translated work to Basque.

== Published work ==
Narrative
- Ara sí que l'he feta bona!. Barcelona: Cruïlla, 1992
- Ai, que caic!. Barcelona: Cruïlla, 1995
- Roberluxtina i la reunió de les bruixes. Barcelona: Cruïlla, 1995
- Parlem d'amor. Barcelona: Proa, 2006
Novels
- L'esbudellador de l'Eixample. Barcelona: Cruïlla, 1993
- L'home del jaguar blanc : les oportunitats de l'Albert Jofresa/1. Barcelona: La Magrana, 1997
- 108.3 FM. Jocs de lluna : les oportunitats de l'Albert Jofresa/2. Barcelona: La Magrana, 1997
- Somni de Tànger. Barcelona: La Magrana, 1997
- Sense adreça coneguda. Barcelona: Barcanova, 1997
- N. de Néstor : les oportunitats de l'Albert Jofresa/3. Barcelona: La Magrana, 1998
- Serà de nit. Barcelona: La Magrana, 1999
- Francis X Jofresa. Barcelona: La Magrana, 2000
- Dies de pluja. Barcelona: Barcanova, 2003
- De què tens por, Bonica?. Barcelona: Barcanova, 2009
- País de llops. Barcelona: Proa, 2010
Literary studies
- Jocs textuals. La narració. Barcelona: La Magrana, 1997
Theatre
- Equívoc : ho sento, amic. Barcelona: Associació d'Actors i Directors Professionals de Catalunya, 1992
